The Delhi Eye transportable Ferris wheel installation at Kalindi Kunj Park in the Okhla neighbourhood of Delhi, India, opened to the public in October 2014.

The wheel can carry six passengers, from which Akshardham Temple, Humayun's Tomb, Lotus Temple, Qutb Minar and Red Fort are visible on a clear day. It was constructed by Dutch Wheels BV.

References

Transportable Ferris wheels
Buildings and structures in Delhi
Tourist attractions in Delhi